was a Japanese academic, writer, and professor emeritus at the University of Tokyo. Sakamoto, a leading proponent of pacifism during Japan's post-war period, has been credited as a pioneer of  international political studies in the country.

In 1966, Sakamoto won the Yoshino Sakuzo Prize for his opinion piece, "Proposals for Japanese diplomacy," which called for the establishment of diplomatic relations between Japan and the People's Republic of China.

Sakamoto died at a hospital in Tokyo on October 2, 2014, at the age of 87.

References

1927 births
2014 deaths
Japanese pacifists
Japanese political writers
Academic staff of the University of Tokyo